Forgiven is a 2006 film directed by Paul Fitzgerald starring Paul Fitzgerald, Russell Hornsby and Kate Jennings Grant.

Cast
 Paul Fitzgerald as Peter Miles
 Russell Hornsby as Ronald Bradler
 Kate Jennings Grant as Jamie Doyle
 Susan Floyd as Kate Miles

Accolades

External links
 Forgiven on IMDb

Films shot in North Carolina
2006 drama films
2006 films
2000s English-language films